Engel Manuel Beltré (born November 1, 1989) is a Dominican professional baseball outfielder who is currently a free agent. He played in Major League Baseball (MLB) for the Texas Rangers in 2013.

Career
Beltré briefly lived in New York City, attending DeWitt Clinton High School in 2003.  As a child, he was a devoted Yankees fan.

Boston Red Sox
Beltré was signed by the Boston Red Sox as an international free agent out of the Dominican Republic in 2006 for $575k or $600k.

Texas Rangers
On July 31, 2007, Beltré along with Kason Gabbard and David Murphy were traded from the Red Sox to the Texas Rangers for Éric Gagné.

Beltré started the 2013 season with the Triple-A Round Rock Express. He was recalled by the Rangers on June 23, 2013 when Craig Gentry was added to the disabled list. He made his MLB debut on June 26 against the New York Yankees as a pinch runner in the ninth inning and was caught stealing second base. He got his first two major league hits the next day against Phil Hughes. Beltré was optioned back to Round Rock on August 2, and recalled on August 5. He elected free agency on November 6, 2015.

Piratas De Campeche
On May 3, 2016, Beltre signed with the Piratas de Campeche of the Mexican Baseball League. He was released on June 30, 2017.

Saraperos De Saltillo
On April 15, 2018, Beltré signed with the Saraperos de Saltillo of the Mexican Baseball League. He was released on May 4, 2018.

Winter Leagues
During the 2018-21 winter seasons, Beltre played for three different teams in the Dominican Winter League (LIDOM)

During the 2021-22 winter season, he played in Puerto Rico for the  Criollos de Caguas in the Liga de Béisbol Profesional Roberto Clemente.

Charleston Dirty Birds
On April 12, 2022, Beltré signed with the Charleston Dirty Birds of the Atlantic League of Professional Baseball. He was released on August 8, 2022.

Team Spain
Beltré played in the 2013 World Baseball Classic with the Spain national baseball team.

He also played for Team Spain in the 2019 European Baseball Championship and in the 2021 European Baseball Championship. He also played for the team at the Africa/Europe 2020 Olympic Qualification tournament, in Italy in September 2019 , and was suspended for three games for his part in a brawl on September 21.

Beltré was selected to represent Spain at the 2023 World Baseball Classic qualification.

References

External links

1989 births
Living people
Arizona League Rangers players
Azucareros del Este players
Bakersfield Blaze players
Charlotte Knights players
Clinton LumberKings players
DeWitt Clinton High School alumni
Dominican Republic expatriate baseball players in Mexico
Dominican Republic expatriate baseball players in the United States
Frisco RoughRiders players
Gulf Coast Red Sox players
Major League Baseball players from the Dominican Republic
Major League Baseball outfielders
Mexican League baseball outfielders
Piratas de Campeche players
Richmond Flying Squirrels players
Round Rock Express players
Saraperos de Saltillo players
Spokane Indians players
Sportspeople from Santo Domingo
Surprise Rafters players
Texas Rangers players
Tigres del Licey players
Toros del Este players
2013 World Baseball Classic players
2019 European Baseball Championship players